Bravo Johnson is a band led by the Spanish songwriter Ricardo Amurrio. The music of Bravo Johnson covers a variety of genres including blues, Americana, classic rock, and folk.  Bravo Johnson has been played on radio stations nationwide, and was called one of the potential "breakthrough artists of 2008".

Amurrio, the band's lead singer and songwriter, provided the soundtrack of the Bernardo Bertolucci film Cinema Sex Politics: Bertolucci Makes "The Dreamers".

Discography 

2006 - Aimlessly Drifting
2008 - The Crooked and the Straight

References

External links
 Official Site
Bravo Johnson's Myspace Page

Musical groups from California